Nevzat Güzelırmak (1 January 1942 – 12 October 2020) was a Turkish football defender and later manager. He was capped 18 times for Turkey.

References

1942 births
2020 deaths
Turkish footballers
Göztepe S.K. footballers
Turkey international footballers
Association football defenders
Turkish football managers
Antalyaspor managers
Göztepe S.K. managers
Boluspor managers
Denizlispor managers
Konyaspor managers
Bursaspor managers
Altay S.K. managers
Karşıyaka S.K. managers
Kayseri Erciyesspor managers
Sarıyer S.K. managers
Adana Demirspor managers